Escándalo de estrellas is a 1944 Mexican musical comedy film directed by Ismael Rodríguez. It stars Pedro Infante, Blanquita Amaro, and Florencio Castelló.

References

External links
 

1944 films
1944 musical comedy films
Mexican black-and-white films
Mexican musical comedy films
Films directed by Ismael Rodríguez
1940s Mexican films